The 2011 Minnesota Swarm season was the seventh season of the Minnesota Swarm, a lacrosse team based in Saint Paul, Minnesota playing in the National Lacrosse League.

Standings

Game log
Reference:

Playoffs

Game log
Reference:

Roster

See also
2011 NLL season

References

Minnesota Swarm seasons
2011 in lacrosse
Minnesota Swarm